Carneades vittata is a species of beetle in the family Cerambycidae. It was described by Gahan in 1889. It is known from Brazil, Ecuador, Bolivia, and Peru.

References

Colobotheini
Beetles described in 1889